The 2010 Copa Libertadores de Fútbol Femenino was the second edition of the Copa Libertadores de Fútbol Femenino, CONMEBOL's premier annual international women's club tournament. The competition was played in São Paulo state, Brazil, from 2 October to 17 October 2010. Santos were the defending champions and successfully defended their title receiving not a single goal against. All matches were played at Arena Barueri in Barueri.

Gloria Villamayor and Noelia Cuevas won the top scorer award with 8 goals each.

Qualified teams

Venue

Round and draw dates 
The draw for the competition took place on 13 September 2010.

First stage 
The top two teams from each group advanced to the semifinals.

Group A 

Match times are local time (UTC−3).

Group B 

Match times are local time (UTC−3).

Final stages

Semifinals

Third place match

Final

Top scorer 
The top of the goal scoring table.

References 

2010
2010 in women's association football
2010 in South American football
Lib
International club association football competitions hosted by Brazil
International women's association football competitions hosted by Brazil